Hemipholis is a genus of brittle stars.

Species 

Hemipholis affinis (Ljungman, 1867)
Hemipholis cordifera (Bosc, 1802)
Hemipholis elongata (Say, 1825)
Hemipholis gracilis (Verrill, 1867)
Hemipholis microdiscus (Duncan, 1879)
Hemipholis wallichii (Duncan, 1881)

References

Ophiactidae
Ophiuroidea genera